This article lists the seasons played by Cardiff Rugby from 2003, when they formed. The list details the club's achievements in senior league and cup competitions, and the top scorers for each season.

Seasons

Key

Key to league record:
P = Played
W = Games won
D = Games drawn
L = Games lost
F = Points for
A = Points against
Pts = Points
Pos = Final position

Key to rounds:
QR = Qualifying round
Group = Group Stages
QF = Quarter-finals 
SF = Semi-finals
RU = Runners-up
W = Winners

References 

Seasons